Carat may refer to:

Jewelry making
 Carat (mass), a unit of mass for gemstones, equal to 0.2 gram 
 Carat (or Karat), a unit for measuring the fineness or purity of gold

Aviation
 AMS-Flight Carat, a motorized sailplane

Entertainment
 Carat (board game)
 Carat, the name for fans of K-pop group Seventeen
 Carat, a single by Japanese pop singer Sifow

Other
 Carat UK, UK advertising agency
 Cooperation Afloat Readiness and Training, a naval exercise
 Volkswagen Carat, a car model
 Kareth, a term in Jewish Halakha